Salgado may refer to:

Places in Brazil
Salgado, a municipality of Sergipe
Salgado (micro-region), a division of Pará (see Vigia, Brazil)
Salgado de São Félix, a municipality of Paraíba

People
Salgado (name)

See also 
General Salgado, a municipality of São Paulo
 Brazilian cuisine#Popular dishes — Salgadinhos, plural diminutive form of salgado, a popular street food